Jaakko Ilkka is a folk opera by Finnish composer Jorma Panula composed in 1977-1978 which deals with the eponymous peasant leader of the Cudgel War of 1596. The opera uses material from Finnish folk and fiddle music and premiered at the Ilmajoki Music Festival in 1978. 

The libretto was written by Aarni Krohn. It tells the story of Jaako Ilkka, a wealthy landowner from Ilmajoki who becomes the leader of the peasant uprising against Klaus Fleming. The opera culminates with Ilkka’s defeat after having been turned on by his own troops.

Jaakko Ilkka was performed at the Ilmajoki Music Festival during the summers of 1978–1981 under the direction of Edvin Laine, featuring Tuomo Häkkilä as Jaako Ilkka. The role of Katariina was played by soprano Ritva Auvinen with baritone Jorma Falck as Klaus Flemings and bass baritone Eero Piirto Kylmä-Jyrää. Other performers included Jorma Hynninen, Jaakko Ryhänen and Jaakko Hietikko. The performances featured the Finnish National Opera Orchestra and the Ilmajoki Opera Choir under the direction of composer Jorma Panula. Costumes were designed by costumer and fashion artist Kirsti Maunula.

The opera was again performed at the Ilmajoki Music Festival in 1996–1997, featuring Jyrki Anttila as Jaakko Ilkka alongside performers Kaisa Hannula, Tommi Hakala, and Juha Uusitalo.

References

Finnish-language operas
Operas
1978 operas
Operas by Jorma Panula
Operas set in the 16th century
Operas set in Finland
Ilkka
Ilkka
Folk opera